Glaziophyton is a Brazilian genus of bamboo in the grass family.

Species
The only known species is Glaziophyton mirabile, native to the State of Rio de Janeiro in southeastern Brazil.

References

Bambusoideae
Endemic flora of Brazil
Grasses of Brazil
Flora of Rio de Janeiro (state)
Bambusoideae genera
Monotypic Poaceae genera
Taxa named by Adrien René Franchet